Cartier is a former provincial electoral division in Manitoba, Canada. It was located in Cartier, Manitoba. The district was first appeared in the 1879 election and lasted until 1892 when the riding was re-distributed into Morris.

Provincial representatives to the Legislative Assembly of Manitoba

Former provincial electoral districts of Manitoba